The Tirio languages are a family of Trans–New Guinea languages in the classification of Malcolm Ross. The Tirio languages have about 40% of their lexicon in common.

Languages
Baramu
Bitur (Mutum)
Tirio (Makayam, Aturu)
Were (Kiunum)

Evans (2018) lists the Tirio languages as:
Tirio (Makayam)
Bitur (Paswam, Mutum)
Lewada-Dewara, spoken on Dewala village on Sumogi Island
Adulu (Aturu), also spoken on Sumogi Island

Baramu is somewhat more divergent in vocabulary, but this may reflect language contact rather than divergence in its position within the family. Pronouns are only available for Tirio itself (Makayam).

The moribund language Abom was once classified as a divergent Tirio language, sharing only an eighth of its lexicon with the others, but it turns out to not belong to the family at all, nor to the Anim family that Tirio is a branch of.

A survey of the Tirio languages can be found in Jore and Alemán (2002).

Phonemes
Usher (2020) reconstructs the consonant inventory as follows:

{| 
| *m || *n ||  || 
|-
| *p || *t ||  || *k 
|-
| *mb || *nd || || *ŋg 
|-
|  || *s ||  || 
|-
| *w || *ɾ || *j || *ɣ 
|}
Vowels are *a *e *i *o *u.

Pronouns
The pronouns are:
{| 
! !!sg!!pl
|-
!1
|*naoɣ||*naoj
|-
!2
|*ɣaoɣ||*jaoɣ
|-
!3m
|*igi||rowspan=2|*jiɣ
|-
!3f
| –
|}

Evolution
Lower Fly River (Makayam and Baramu) reflexes of proto-Trans-New Guinea (pTNG) etyma:

Makayam makoːth, Baramu mangoːt ‘chin’ < *maŋgat[a] ‘mouth, teeth’
Makayam (Giribam dialect) Bitur, Baramu moːm ‘seed’ < *maŋgV ‘fruit, seed, round’
Makayam sakoa ‘lower arm’, Baramu saga ‘arm’ < *sa(ŋg,k)(a,i)l ‘hand, claw’

References

External links 
 Timothy Usher, New Guinea World, Proto–Lower Fly River

 
Languages of Papua New Guinea
Anim languages